Black Cross (also known as The Black Cross) is an iconic painting by Kazimir Malevich. The first version was done in 1915. From the mid-1910s, Malevich abandoned any trace of figurature or representation from his paintings in favour of pure abstraction.

History 
Black Cross was first shown in The Last Futurist Exhibition 0,10 in 1915.
One of the parts of Kazimir Malevich’s triptych (Black Square, Black Cross, Black Circle).

Bibliography 
Gray, Camilla. The Great Experiment: Russian Art, 1863–1922. New York: Harry N. Abrams, 1962
Farthing, Stephen. 1001 Paintings You Must See Before You Die. Cassel Illustrated, 2011. 
Néret, Gilles. Kazimir Malevich 1878–1935 and Suprematism. Taschen, 2003.

References 

1915 paintings
Suprematism (art movement)
Paintings by Kazimir Malevich